Indian Petrochemicals Corporation Limited (IPCL) was a petrochemicals company in India. At the time of its divestment to Reliance Industries Limited, its turnover for the financial year 2005-06 had crossed the US $2 billion mark.

History 
IPCL was established on 22 March 1969, as a Government of India undertaking, with the objective of promoting the development of the petrochemical industry in India. Prime Minister Smt. Indira Gandhi, invited Shri Jayant Jyotendra Mehta (who had built the National Rayon plant at Kalyan) to head the IPCL project. Jayant J. Mehta was the founder Chairman and Managing Director of IPCL. The Company began construction of its first petrochemicals complex at Vadodara in 1970. Commercial production at the complex commenced in 1973. The Company’s second petrochemicals complex in Nagothana was commissioned in 1992 and its third complex at Gandhar was commissioned in 1996. In August 1992, the Company’s shares were listed on all the major stock exchanges in India including Bombay Stock Exchange and National Stock Exchange of India.

Consolidation 
On 1 April 2005, the six polyester companies namely Appollo Fibres Limited (AFL), Central India Polyesters Limited (CIPL), India Polyfibres Limited (IPL), Orissa Polyfibres Limited (OPL), Recron Synthetics Limited (RSL) and Silvassa Industries Private Limited (SIPL) have been amalgamated with IPCL. This marks the entry of the Company in the polyester sector. The polyester units are based in Hoshiarpur (Punjab), Nagpur (Maharashtra), Barabanki (Uttar Pradesh), Baulpur (Orissa), Allahabad (Uttar Pradesh) and Silvassa (Dadra and Nagar Haveli and Daman and Diu).

Disinvestment 
In June 2002, the Government of India as a part of its disinvestment programme divested 26% of its equity shares in favour of Reliance Petroinvestments Limited (RPIL), a Reliance Group Company. RPIL acquired an additional 20% equity shares through a cash offer in terms of SEBI (Takeover Regulations) and held 46% of Company's equity shares. IPCL merged with Reliance Industries Ltd. in 2007.

References

Formerly government-owned companies of India
Petrochemical companies of India
Companies based in Vadodara
Chemical companies established in 1969
Non-renewable resource companies established in 1969
Indian companies established in 1969
1969 establishments in Gujarat